Irwan Prayitno (born 20 December 1963) is an Indonesian politician who was serving as the governor of West Sumatra province. He was elected in the 2010 and 2015 election for the five-year period 2010–2015 and 2016–2021. Before his election as governor, he served as a member of Indonesia's Parliament (DPR-RI) from the election region of West Sumatra for three consecutive periods (1999–2004, 2004–2009, and 2009–2014).

With 32,44% votes, Irwan Prayitno is the second governor of West Sumatra elected by direct popular vote. He was sworn into office along with his deputy governor, Muslim Kasim by the Minister of Home Affairs Gamawan Fauzi on 15 August 2010.

Life 
Irwan Prayitno was born in Yogyakarta, Indonesia. His father, Djamrul Djamal, was from Padang, and his mother, Sudarni Sayuti, from Tanah Datar, West Sumatra. After graduating his secondary school from SMA Negeri 3 (Public Senior High School 3) in Padang, Prayitno pursued his study at the Faculty of Psychology University of Indonesia from 1982 to 1988. Prayitno continued his education at the Putra University in Malaysia where he obtained his master and PhD.

In the 2009 legislative election, Prayitno was elected as member of People's Representative Council (DPR-RI) from the Partai Keadilan Sejahtera (Prosperous Justice Party). Prayitno resigned from the DPR-RI because he decided to run for the election as governor of West Sumatra on 30 June 2010.

References
Footnotes

Bibliography

 
 
 
 
 
 

1963 births
Governors of West Sumatra
People from Yogyakarta
Living people
Prosperous Justice Party politicians
Minangkabau people